Poiretia is the scientific name of two genera of organisms and may refer to:

Poiretia (gastropod), a genus of molluscs in the family Spiraxidae
Poiretia (plant), a genus of plants in the family Fabaceae